The 2016 United Kingdom local elections held on Thursday 5 May 2016 were a series of local elections which were held in 124 local councils and also saw 4 mayoral elections in England which also coincided with elections to the Scottish Parliament, the Welsh Assembly, the Northern Ireland Assembly, the London Assembly, the London mayoral election and the England and Wales Police and crime commissioners. By-elections for the Westminster seats of Ogmore and Sheffield Brightside and Hillsborough were also held. These proved to be David Cameron's last local elections as leader of the Conservative Party and Prime Minister as he resigned two months later following the defeat of Remain in the referendum on Britain's continuing membership of the European Union which was held seven weeks later.

Results

Full results as reported by BBC News.

As these local elections were held in 124 English councils, out of 418 in the whole of the UK, the BBC calculated a Projected National Vote Share (PNV), which aims to assess what the council results indicate the UK-wide vote would be "if the results were repeated at a general election".

The BBC's Projected National Vote Share was 31% for Labour, 30% for the Conservatives, 15% for the Liberal Democrats and 12% for UKIP. These results are included in the infobox for this article. Longstanding elections analysts Colin Rallings and Michael Thrasher of Plymouth University estimate a National Equivalent Vote (NEV) share, and in 2016 put Labour on 33%, the Conservatives on 31%, the Liberal Democrats on 14% and UKIP on 12%.

Metropolitan boroughs

Whole metropolitan council
Three of 36 metropolitan boroughs had all of their seats up for election.

One-third of metropolitan council
32 of 36 metropolitan boroughs had one-third of their seats up for election.

Unitary authorities

Whole unitary council

3 unitary authorities had all of their seats up for election.

One-third of unitary council

16 unitary authorities had one-third of their seats up for election.

District Councils

Whole district councils

12 District Councils had all of their seats up for election.

Half of councils

7 non-metropolitan district councils had half of their seats up for election.

One-third of district councils

51 non-metropolitan district councils had one-third of their seats up for election.

Mayoral elections
Four direct mayoral elections were held.

Police and Crime Commissioner elections

40 elections for Police and Crime Commissioners were held.

Results - English PCC Elections

Results Breakdown

Results - Welsh PCC Elections

Results Breakdown

See also

Other elections being held in the UK on the same day
 2016 London Assembly election
 2016 London mayoral election
 2016 National Assembly for Wales election
 2016 Northern Ireland Assembly election
 2016 Scottish Parliament election
 2016 Ogmore by-election
 2016 Sheffield Brightside and Hillsborough by-election

Notes

References

External links
 Local Government Political Control 

 
2016 elections in the United Kingdom